Oblong Township is one of ten townships in Crawford County, Illinois, USA.  As of the 2010 census, its population was 2,789 and it contained 1,251 housing units.

Geography

Cities, towns, villages
 Oblong
 Stoy

Unincorporated towns
 Dogwood
 Oil Center
(This list is based on USGS data and may include former settlements.)

Cemeteries
The township contains these three cemeteries: Oblong, Prier and White Oak.

Major highways
  Illinois Route 33

Lakes
 Oblong Lake

Landmarks
 Oblong Park

Demographics

School districts
 Oblong Community Unit School District 4
 Robinson Community Unit School District 2

Political districts
 Illinois's 15th congressional district
 State House District 109
 State Senate District 55

References
 
 United States Census Bureau 2007 TIGER/Line Shapefiles
 United States National Atlas

External links
 City-Data.com
 Illinois State Archives

Townships in Crawford County, Illinois
Townships in Illinois